Hollywood Park is a town in Bexar County, Texas, United States. The population was 3,130 at the 2020 census. It is an enclave within far north central San Antonio and is part of the San Antonio Metropolitan Statistical Area.

Geography
Hollywood Park is located about 15 miles north of downtown San Antonio.

Demographics

As of the 2020 United States census, there were 3,130 people, 1,169 households, and 954 families residing in the town.

As of the census of 2000, there were 2,983 people, 1,174 households, and 906 families residing in the town. The population density was 2,027.3 people per square mile (783.5/km2). There were 1,222 housing units at an average density of 830.5 per square mile (321.0/km2). The racial makeup of the town was 95.64% White, 0.27% African American, 0.27% Native American, 0.94% Asian, 0.13% Pacific Islander, 1.11% from other races, and 1.64% from two or more races. Hispanic or Latino of any race were 10.06% of the population.

There were 1,174 households, out of which 25.8% had children under the age of 18 living with them, 69.6% were married couples living together, 5.7% had a female householder with no husband present, and 22.8% were non-families. 21.0% of all households were made up of individuals, and 16.4% had someone living alone who was 65 years of age or older. The average household size was 2.49 and the average family size was 2.87.

In the town, the population was spread out, with 20.7% under the age of 18, 3.4% from 18 to 24, 21.0% from 25 to 44, 27.3% from 45 to 64, and 27.7% who were 65 years of age or older. The median age was 49 years. For every 100 females, there were 88.7 males. For every 100 females age 18 and over, there were 86.0 males.

The median income for a household in the town was $64,844, and the median income for a family was $81,702. Males had a median income of $52,344 versus $40,781 for females. The per capita income for the town was $34,138. None of the families and 2.7% of the population were living below the poverty line, including no under eighteens and 5.7% of those over 64.

Education 
Hollywood Park is within the North East Independent School District. Hidden Forest Elementary School, Bradley Middle School, and Churchill High School in San Antonio serve Hollywood Park.

History 

The Town of Hollywood Park was officially incorporated on December 7, 1955, after residents were concerned about losing the neighborhood's autonomy to San Antonio.  The community has a distinctly rural feel and residents often build homes they intend to live in for the rest of their lives.  Many of the community's leaders of today are the children and grandchildren of some of the original residents.

The Police Department was established in 1955 soon after the town was incorporated.  John Nelson was hired as its first Police Chief.  The police car was a Ford Fairlane 500.  Shortly thereafter, a few volunteer part-time policemen joined the force.  When the town was formed, water hoses had to stay connected at each residence and ready to use in case of a fire.  In 1958, a group of men joined together and a couple of volunteers attended the Firefighters School at Texas A&M University, and the Hollywood Park Volunteer Fire Department was founded.  That year all the firemen had was a small pump unit.  Robert Oakes, as general chairman, and many volunteers organized the first Hollywood Park Volunteer Fire Department Benefit Barbeque held June 22, 1968, at Raymond Russell Park.  Volunteers prepared all the food.  746 people went through the serving line.  The event was held for many years at Raymond Russell Park with games for the entire family and a live band.  Funds were raised for equipment and to purchase 20 new two-way portable alerting units.  Fred T. Keepers, Jr. was Fire Chief from 1967–1978.  By 1969, eighteen dedicated volunteers provided protection for the 612 residents of Hollywood Park, Hill Country Village, as well as over a large area of ranchlands in the northernmost sections of Bexar County.  The City provided the firemen with bright yellow uniforms, but they got no other compensation for their duty.  The largest fire occurred in August 1968 when a grass fire erupted near Hwy 281 and burned off 3,000 acres.  By 1973, there were 29 volunteers.  A new Rescue Unit was purchased through fund raising projects and donations.

In 1971, Mr. Voigt—a rancher who owned the land the town was built on—donated $10,000 to the Town of Hollywood Park to build the Voigt Center, naming Alverne Halloran as custodian, until the town matched funds to begin building.  The 3,000 sq. ft. recreation building was finally built in 1974, and the grand opening and dedication was held on October 20, 1974.  This was a day of fun and entertainment with games, food and drink offered.  The City Council designated this day as "E.E.Voigt Day" in honor of the occasion.  Mayor Felix Forshage opened the ceremony.  Mr. Voigt introduced his family and spoke of the origin of the park.  Tennis courts and a covered picnic area were built in 1975 with an additional $5,000 donation from Mr. Voigt for the tennis courts.  A children's playground was added later.

In addition to the homes originally built in Hollywood Park, two additional sections were added later to include The Gardens of Hollywood Park and The Enclave of Hollywood Park.

Mayors of Hollywood Park 

Clifford Mann – Elected 1955, first mayor of Hollywood Park
Alfred E. Schweppe – Mayor from 1959 to 1964
Yates Field – Mayor from 1964 to 1968
Dixon O. Brown – Mayor from 1968 to 1970
Felix Forshage – Mayor from 1970 to 1976
Yuell C. Chandler – Mayor from 1976 to 1977
Ruby W. Weinholt – Mayor from 1977 to 1986, former President and CEO of St. Joseph's Credit Union, 2001 inductee into the Texas Credit Union Hall of Fame
Steven R. Silvia – Mayor in 1986
Patricia Flynn – Mayor from 1986 to 1988
Bala K. Srinivas – Mayor from 1988 to 1994
Ralph S. Hoggatt – Mayor from 1994 to 1996
Roy D. Lemons – Mayor from 1996 to 1998
Gary Mercer – Mayor from 1998 to 2000, won as a write-in candidate
Harold Burris – Mayor from 2000 to July 2003, resigned
Sean P. Martinez – Mayor from July 2003 to June 2005, appointed when Burris resigned, re-elected in 2004, resigned
Richard W. McIlveen – Mayor from June 2005 to 2010, appointed when Martinez resigned, re-elected to two terms
Bob Sartor – Mayor from 2010 to 2012
William "Bill" Bohlke – Elected in May 2012; Bohlke was killed on his ranch in late August 2012 in an apparent attack by a male donkey.
Mark Perry – Mayor from August 2012 to May 2013; Son-in-law of William "Bill" Bohlke and was appointed after his passing.
David Ortega – Mayor from 2013 to 2014; Completion of William "Bill" Bohlke's unexpired term.
Chris Fails – Mayor from 2014 to 2018
Chris Murphy – Mayor from 2018 to 2021; Resigned mayoral position due to federal contract work that precludes employees from holding public office.
Oscar Villarreal - 2021-2022; Appointed from Place 3 on HP City Council- will serve remainder of Murphy's term until May 2022.
 Sean Moore - former city council member,current mayor May 2022 – present.

Notes

References

External links

 Town of Hollywood Park

Towns in Bexar County, Texas
Towns in Texas
Greater San Antonio
Enclaves in the United States